Arizonasaurus was a ctenosauriscid archosaur from the Middle Triassic (243 million years ago). Arizonasaurus is found in the Middle Triassic Moenkopi Formation of northern Arizona. A fairly complete skeleton was found in 2002 by Sterling Nesbitt. The taxon has a large sailback formed by elongated neural spines of the vertebrae. The type species, Arizonasaurus babbitti, was named by Samuel Paul Welles in 1947.

Discovery and naming
The type species, Arizonasaurus babbitti, was named by Samuel Paul Welles in 1947 on the basis of a few teeth and a maxilla, labelled as specimen UCMP 36232. A fairly complete skeleton was found in 2002 by Sterling Nesbitt.

Description

Arizonasaurus had a sail made of tall neural spines. This sail was similar to those of other basal archosaurs, such as other ctenosauriscids like Ctenosauriscus, Lotosaurus, Bromsgroveia, and Hypselorhachis.

Arizonasaurus is described from two braincase specimens. Some ancestral features of these braincases are plesiomorphic for crurotarsans.

Below is a list of characteristics found by Nesbitt in 2005 that distinguish Arizonasaurus:

a deep fossa hidden from view on the posteroventral edge of the upward-pointing process of the maxilla;
and a tongue-groove attachment between the pubis and the ilium.

Classification
Arizonasaurus was closely related to Ctenosauriscus; and, together with a few other genera, they make up Ctenosauriscidae. The ctenosauriscids were closely related to the poposaurids, as shown by a few shared derived characteristics. The pelvic girdle in Arizonasaurus unites this taxon with Ctenosauriscus, Lotosaurus, Bromsgroveia, and Hypselorhachus. Together, newly identified pseudosuchian features act as evidence that poposaurids, such as Poposaurus, Sillosuchus, and Chatterjeea, and ctenosauriscids form a monophyletic group that is derived rauisuchians.

Below is a phylogenetic cladogram simplified from Butler et al. in 2011 showing the cladistics of Archosauriformes, focusing mostly on Pseudosuchia:

Biogeography
Arizonasaurus is from the middle Triassic Moenkopi Formation of northern Arizona. The presence of a poposauroid in the early Middle Triassic suggests that the divergence of birds and crocodiles occurred earlier than previously thought. Ctenosauriscids from the Middle Triassic allow the distribution of Triassic faunas to be more widespread, now in Europe, Asia, North America and Africa. The fauna of the Moenkopi Formation represents a stage transitional fauna between the faunas of older and younger age.

References

External links

 Artistic rendering of Arizonasaurus babbitti
 
 Initial description of complete skeleton by Sterling Nesbitt in Royal Society Biology Letters
 Braincase of Arizonasaurus babbitti

Ctenosauriscids
Middle Triassic reptiles of North America
Triassic archosaurs
Fossil taxa described in 1947
Taxa named by Samuel Paul Welles
Prehistoric pseudosuchian genera